The 2003 Chinese Jia-A League season is the tenth season of professional association football and the 42nd top-tier overall league season in China. The league started on March 15 and ended on November 30, 2003, while in preparation for the rebranded Chinese Super League three teams were relegated at the end of the season.

Shanghai Shenhua finished as champions. However, they were later retrospectively stripped of the title on 19 February 2013 for match-fixing. Runners-up Shanghai International were also surrounded in their own match-fixing controversy, which saw several of their players taking bribes. Despite the club itself not being implicated in these crimes the season's title was not awarded to any club.

Overview
The 2003 Chinese Jia-A League season was the last season before it was rebranded as the Chinese Super League by the Chinese Football Association and had 15 teams, with one team provided a bye for each round. Three teams were relegated at the end of the season. However, relegation was based on an averaging system using the last seasons and this season's final position.

At the end of the season, Shanghai Shenhua narrowly won the championship against their local neighbours Shanghai International. Critics would dispute the legitimacy of the title win after it was discovered in 2011 that the Shenhua General manager Lou Shifang bribed the head of the Chinese Football Association referee arrangements Zhang Jianqiang and referee Lu Jun 350,000 yuan each to be bias towards Shenhua in a vital match against Shanghai International in a game that Shenhua won 4–1. While all three men were officially charged with match-fixing, the club was spared any disciplinary action and were allowed to keep the title with the reason provided by the Chinese football association for the leniency being that they would be punishing the individuals who put the game in disrepute and not the club, because Lou Shifang was Shenhua's offending participant and had left the club several years before the allegations were confirmed it would have been harsh to punish the club retrospectively. On 18 February 2013, The CFA decided to change its mind on Shenhua and retrospectively decided to punish the club by revoking its 2003 league title, fining the club 1 million yuan and giving a 6-point deduction at the beginning of the 2013 Chinese Super League season after it was discovered that they also fixed another game against Shaanxi Guoli F.C. en route to winning the 2003 league title. Shanghai International, however, were not retrospectively awarded the title after it was officially confirmed on June 13, 2012, that the Shanghai International players Shen Si, Qi Hong, Jiang Jin and Li Ming (1975) took a bribe from former Tianjin Teda F.C. general manager Yang Yifeng to lose their November 30, 2003 game, which saw all offending participants fined and jailed for their crimes as well as the Chinese FA deciding that Tianjin should also face a 1 million Yuan and 6-point deduction at the beginning of the 2013 Chinese Super League season.

Also within the season Chongqing Lifan F.C. were relegated at the end of the campaign. However, they were allowed to remain within the division for next season when they bought Yunnan Hongta's registration and merged the two clubs together. While at the end of the campaign saw the loss of August 1st football club who were relegated and decided to disband at the end of the season. The club who were the sport branch of the People's Liberation Army had been in existence for over fifty years and were one of the most successful clubs in Chinese history during the amateur era. However, because all the players had to be active military members and paid accordingly made it impossible for them to compete with the other clubs who were now also paying professional wages to their players, which also saw the club struggle within the professional era and lead to the clubs disbandment.

League standings

Relegation
Chinese Super League qualification was based on the average positioning of the teams from the 2002 and 2003 league standings.

(Based on Positions in 2002 (x 0.5) and 2003 (x 1))

Source:

Top scorers

Awards
Player of the year (Golden Ball Award)
Jörg Albertz (Shanghai Shenhua)

Top scorer (Golden Boot Award)
Saul Martínez (Shanghai Shenhua)
Li Yi (Shenzhen Jianlibao)
Kwame Ayew (Changsha Ginde)

Manager of the year
Wu Jingui (Shanghai Shenhua)

Youth player of the year
Liu Jindong ( Shandong Luneng )

CFA Team of the Year

Goalkeeper: Jiang Jin (Shanghai International)

Defence: Xu Yunlong (Beijing Guoan), Du Wei (Dalian Wanda), Li Weifeng (Shenzhen Jianlibao), Adilson (Dalian Shide)

Midfield: Zheng Zhi (Shenzhen Jianlibao), Zhao Junzhe (Liaoning Zhongshun), Jörg Albertz (Shanghai Shenhua), Shen Si (Shanghai International)

Attack: Saul Martínez (Shanghai Shenhua), Li Yi (Shenzhen Jianlibao),

See also
2003–2009 Chinese football match-fixing scandals
Chinese Jia-A League
Chinese Super League
Chinese Football Association Jia League
Chinese Football Association Yi League
Chinese FA Cup
Chinese Football Association
Football in China
List of football records in China
Chinese clubs in the AFC Champions League

References

External links
China – List of final tables (RSSSF)

Chinese Jia-A League seasons
1
China
China
2003 establishments in China